Kanuri may refer to:
 Kanuri people, an ethnic group in West Africa
 Kanuri language, spoken by the Kanuri people

Language and nationality disambiguation pages